Woking High School (formerly named Horsell High School) is a coeducational secondary school with academy status, located in the Horsell area of Woking, Surrey, England.

The school has held specialist technology status since 2004, and converted to become an academy in 2013. It has around 1200 pupils on roll.

Notable alumni
 Max Bowden, English actor
 Robert Green, English footballer
 Leadley, English singer-songwriter, YouTuber, and presenter
 Matt Willis, English musician, singer-songwriter, television presenter and actor

References

External links
Woking High School official website

Secondary schools in Surrey
Academies in Surrey
Specialist technology colleges in England